John Walker Ryon (March 4, 1825 – March 12, 1901) was a Democratic member of the U.S. House of Representatives from Pennsylvania.

Biography
John W. Ryon was born in Elkland, Pennsylvania.  He attended the common schools, Millville Academy in Orleans County, New York, and Wellsboro Academy in Wellsboro, Pennsylvania.  He studied law, was admitted to the bar in 1847 and commenced practice in Lawrenceville, Pennsylvania.  He served as district attorney of Tioga County, Pennsylvania, from 1850 to 1856.  During the American Civil War, Ryon assisted in the organization of Company A of the famous Bucktail Regiment.  He was appointed by Governor Andrew Gregg Curtin as paymaster with the rank of major in the reserve corps.  He moved to Pottsville, Pennsylvania, and resumed the practice of law.

Ryon was elected as a Democrat to the Forty-sixth Congress.  He served as president of the Pennsylvania National Bank for several years.  He died in Pottsville in 1901.  Interment in St. Patrick's (No. 3) Cemetery.

References
 Retrieved on 2008-02-14
The Political Graveyard

1825 births
1901 deaths
Politicians from Pottsville, Pennsylvania
Pennsylvania lawyers
Union Army soldiers
Democratic Party members of the United States House of Representatives from Pennsylvania
Pennsylvania Reserves
19th-century American politicians